Michael "Meic" Povey (28 November 1950 – 5 December 2017) was a Welsh screenwriter, director and actor in Welsh and English language roles, considered to be one of Wales's leading playwrights and screenwriters. He was also one of the co-creators of the long running soap opera Pobol y Cwm.

Outside Wales, he was probably best known for portraying DC Jones, DS Chisholm's put-upon detective constable in the popular series Minder.
Originally from Nant Gwynant, near Beddgelert in Gwynedd, Povey lived in Cardiff for many years. He died of cancer on 5 December 2017, aged 67.

In October 2021 The Minder Podcast paid tribute to Povey.

Works

Plays
Curious Under the Stars (2016)
Tyner yw'r Lleuad Heno (2009)
Hen Bobl Mewn Ceir (2006)
Life of Ryan ... and Ronnie (2005)
Indian Country (2003)
Yr Hen Blant (1999)
 Diwedd y Byd (1999)
 Tair (1998)
Bonanza (1997) (Bonansa)
 Fel Anifail (1995)
 Yn Debyg Iawn i Ti a Fi (1995)

As screenwriter
Byw Celwydd (2016-2018)
Teulu
Talcen Caled
Nel
 Palm Sunday

As actor 
 Minder - DC 'Taff' Jones (1982-1989)
 Gawain and the Green Knight - The Blacksmith (1991)
 Un Nos Ola' Leuad - Preis (1991)
 The Jazz Detective - DS Priest (1992)
 Pobol y Cwm - Eddie Lewis (1991-1994, 1996)
 A Mind to Kill - Jack Bevan (1994-1997)
 Y Mabinogi - voice (2003)
 Doctor Who - Coachman, episode "The Unquiet Dead" (2005)

References

External links

1950 births
2017 deaths
Welsh-speaking actors
Welsh male film actors
Welsh male dramatists and playwrights
Welsh writers
Welsh theatre directors
Welsh film directors
Male actors from Cardiff
Deaths from cancer in Wales